Philip Kassel (September 22, 1876 – May 25, 1959) was an American gymnast and track and field athlete who competed in the 1904 Summer Olympics. He was born in the German Empire. In 1904 he won the gold medal in the team event. He was also 6th in athletics' triathlon event, 11th in gymnastics' all-around competition and 19th in gymnastics' triathlon event.

References

1876 births
1959 deaths
American male artistic gymnasts
Athletes (track and field) at the 1904 Summer Olympics
Gymnasts at the 1904 Summer Olympics
Olympic gymnasts of the United States
Olympic gold medalists for the United States in track and field
Olympic medalists in gymnastics
Medalists at the 1904 Summer Olympics
American male triathletes
Emigrants from the German Empire to the United States